The Nationalist Party of Bulgaria or NPB (Natzionalisticheska Partiya na Bulgaria), was a far-right nationalist political party in Bulgaria that was formed in 2013. Since then the party is believed to have carried out multiple attacks on illegal migrants and refugees within Bulgaria, however, these claims were never substantiated. Some commentators have compared it to the Golden Dawn party in Greece.

References 

Political parties established in 2013
Nationalist parties in Bulgaria
2013 establishments in Bulgaria